Everett A. Sharp (June 25, 1918 – February 1996) was an American football offensive tackle in the National Football League for the Washington Redskins.  He attended California State Polytechnic University, Pomona.

1918 births
1996 deaths
People from Corinth, Mississippi
American football offensive tackles
California State Polytechnic University, Pomona alumni
Washington Redskins players